José Antonio "Tony" Rodríguez Quiles is a Puerto Rican politician affiliated with the Popular Democratic Party (PPD). He was elected to the Puerto Rico House of Representatives in 2012 to represent District 16.  He is a member of Phi Sigma Alpha fraternity.

References

External links
José Rodríguez Profile on El Nuevo Día

Living people
Popular Democratic Party members of the House of Representatives of Puerto Rico
People from San Sebastián, Puerto Rico
Year of birth missing (living people)